Jared Koster (born April 11, 1991) is a Canadian football linebacker who is currently a free agent. He played college football at UCLA.

Tampa Bay Buccaneers

Koster was signed as an undrafted rookie on May 11, 2015.

References

External links
Tampa Bay Buccaneers bio
UCLA Bruins bio

1991 births
American football linebackers
Canadian football linebackers
American players of Canadian football
Tampa Bay Buccaneers players
Montreal Alouettes players
Living people
Players of American football from California
Sportspeople from Riverside County, California
People from Norco, California
UCLA Bruins football players